Pseudosybroides flavescens is a species of beetle in the family Cerambycidae, and the only species in the genus Pseudosybroides. It was described by Breuning in 1972.

References

Apomecynini
Beetles described in 1972
Monotypic beetle genera